Tenbury Wells (locally Tenbury) is a market town and civil parish in the northwestern extremity of the Malvern Hills District of Worcestershire, England. Its northern border adjoins Shropshire, and at the 2011 census it had a population of 3,777.

Geography
Tenbury Wells lies on the south bank of the River Teme; the river forms the border between Shropshire and Worcestershire. The settlement of Burford in Shropshire lies on the north bank of the river.

History

From 1894 to 1974, it was a rural district, comprising the town itself and villages such as Stoke Bliss, Eastham and Rochford. From 1974 Tenbury was in the District of Leominster until it became part of Malvern Hills District when Leominster District Council was taken over by Herefordshire Council in April 1998.

The history of Tenbury Wells extends as far back as the Iron Age. The town has been described as being the home of the Castle Tump, but the Tump is now in Burford, Shropshire due to boundary changes. The Tump, possibly the remains of an early Norman motte and bailey castle, can be seen from the main road (A456) but there are no visible remains of the castle that was constructed, to defend and control the original River Teme crossing. It has also been described as "... the remains of an 11th-century Norman Castle."

Originally named "Temettebury", the town was granted a Royal Charter to hold a market in 1249. Over time, the name changed to "Tenbury". A legal record of 1399 mentions a place spelt perhaps as Temedebury which may be a further variation in spelling. Tenbury was in the upper division of Doddingtree Hundred.

The "Wells" element of the name was added following the discovery of mineral springs and wells in the town in the 1840s.

The arrival of the railways was a cause of great celebrations; a breakfast, carnival and ball were organised in Tenbury Wells in 1864 when the town was connected to the Kidderminster line.

The name of the railway station, which was on the now-defunct Tenbury & Bewdley Railway, was changed to Tenbury Wells in 1912, in an attempt to publicise the mineral water being produced from the wells around the town.

The St Michael and All Angels Choir School devoted to the Anglican choral tradition by Frederick Ouseley closed in 1985 after which the buildings served alternative educational purposes.

For over 100 years Tenbury has been well known throughout the country for its winter auctions of holly and mistletoe (and other Christmas products).  It is also known for its "Chinese-gothic" Pump Room buildings, built in 1862, which reopened in 2001, following a major restoration. They are now owned by Tenbury Town Council, having been transferred from Malvern Hills District Council in September 2008.

Architecture
 
One notable architectural feature in the town is the unique (often described as Chinese-Gothic) Pump Rooms, designed by James Cranston in the 1860s, to house baths where the mineral water was available.

Other notable structures in Tenbury include the parish church of St Mary with a Norman tower, and a number of monuments. The church was essential rebuilt by Henry Woodyer between 1864 and 1865.

The part-medieval bridge over the River Teme, linking Tenbury to Burford, Shropshire was rebuilt by Thomas Telford following flood damage in 1795.

The Grade II-listed Eastham bridge collapsed into the River Teme on 24 May 2016. There were no casualties.

The Victorian workhouse, designed by George Wilkinson, was used as the local council buildings from 1937 until the early 21st century and is currently being converted into residential housing. The Victorian infirmary behind the workhouse was demolished to create car parking for a new Tesco supermarket, which opened on 27 April 2017.

The unique Victorian corrugated iron isolation hospital was demolished on 24 October 2006.

Local interest

Local flooding
For several centuries Tenbury has been subject to flooding, most recently in 2007, 2008 and 2020. The first flood was caused by the River Teme and the Kyre Brook bursting their banks. The second was caused by a combination of 15mm (0.59 in) of rain falling in an hour and the town's drainage system (much of which was blocked) failing to cope, creating flash flooding. The third flood again involved the River Teme and the Kyre Brook bursting their banks. The 2008 flood damage was caused by a combination of the drainage not having been upgraded since the 2007 floods and the wall on Market Street (which should hold back the Kyre Brook) not having been rebuilt following the 2007 floods. Since then much work has been done in respect of improved drainage and particularly defences in Market Street but when the River Teme and the Kyre Brook rose in February 2020, houses and shops were again flooded.

Education
For primary education Tenbury Wells is served by Tenbury CofE Primary School on Bromyard Road. Tenbury High Ormiston Academy on Oldwood Road is the main secondary school for the area, while King's St Michael's College (also on Oldwood Road) is a private international boarding school.

Regal Cinema

The Regal Cinema on Teme Street in Tenbury Wells opened in 1937. It operated as a commercial cinema, one of six in the Craven Cinemas chain, until the decline of British cinema led to its closure in 1966. Following purchase by Tenbury Town Council to prevent demolition, various volunteer groups have run it.

The Regal has been the subject of a Heritage Lottery Fund supported restoration project. Replicas of the 1930s Mediterranean murals by artist George Legge have been painted around the auditorium, the detailing on the front of the building has been recreated, and neon lighting has been erected on the front canopy.

The building, owned by Tenbury Town Council, is now under the management of a trust. Modern equipment now allows the showing of recently released films, live broadcasts and live acts. Paul Daniels was its patron until his death.

In 2016 The Regal was nominated for the "Britain Has Spirit" award.

Local newspapers
Hereford Times, Shropshire Star, South Shropshire Journal, Teme Valley Times, Tenbury Advertiser.

Apple and fruit heritage
Tenbury was also known as "the town in the orchard" due to the large numbers of fruit orchards of apple trees and also pears, quince and plum trees, in the immediate vicinity of the town. This heritage is revisited every October at the Tenbury Applefest.

Markets
Until 2018, markets were held on Tuesday mornings, Friday mornings, and Saturday mornings, in and around the town's Round Market building, which was built by James Cranston in 1858.

Power station shelved
A proposal to build a biomass power station on a business park failed due to residents' concern about the disruption to local businesses during its construction. The proposal continued to attract protests, and in July 2007 a petition against the plans was signed by more than 2,300 people.
In July 2009 it was announced that the £965,000 grant offered to the power station had been withdrawn and the project shelved.

Notable people

Acton Adams (1843–1924), New Zealand politician; born at Willden Manor, Tenbury, his ashes are buried at St Mary's, Tenbury.
Sir Archer Baldwin, Member of Parliament (MP), died at home there 1966.
Dean Vincent Carter, author
Thomas Goode (1835–1926), South Australian pastoral pioneer, born at Kyre Magna near Tenbury.
Ian Griggs, later Bishop of Ludlow, was priest-in-charge of the parish of Tenbury 1984–87.
Henry Hill Hickman, pioneer of anaesthesia, practiced as surgeon at Teme Street in the town where he died in 1830.
Jason King, DJ and television presenter, born at Tenbury
Tom Matthews, mayor of Tenbury and chairman of former Leominster District Council.
Frederick Ouseley, composer, organist, and musical scholar; founder and first Warden of St Michael's College.
Wilfred Shorting, cricketer, born at Tenbury.

Nearest railway stations

The nearest open stations are located on the Welsh Marches Line are Ludlow railway station and Leominster.

The nearest point of operational railway is at Woofferton railway station, but the station has been closed since 1961.

See also
Tenbury Community Hospital

References

Further reading
Miller, Howard (2004): Tenbury Wells and the Teme Valley

External links
Tenbury Museum 
Tenbury and Burford Civic Society
Tenbury Town Council
Teme Valley Times

 
Towns in Worcestershire
Spa towns in England
Market towns in Worcestershire
Civil parishes in Worcestershire
Malvern Hills District